The Ministry of Health of Chile, also known as MINSAL, is the cabinet-level administrative office in charge of planning, directing, coordinating, executing, controlling and informing the public health policies formulated by the President of Chile. Notably, all employees pay 7% of their monthly income to FONASA, the funding branch of the Chilean Ministry of Health.

The current Minister of Health is Ximena Aguilera. The minister has two adjuncts: the Undersecretary of Public Health and the Undersecretary of Assistance Networks.

History

In 1808, the Committee of Vaccines was founded, and then in 1832 the Board of Directors of Hospitals began operations. Both organizations were precursors of what would become the modern institutions of public health. In 1907, a division charged with the administration of public hygiene was created under the Ministry of the Interior. Then on 14 October 1924, this division was made into the cabinet-level Ministry of Hygiene, Social Assistance and Welfare, with the same function (Decree No. 44, 1924). In 1927 all the ministries underwent an important restructuring; with these change it became the Ministry of Social Welfare, and was charged with, as well as the coordination of public health policies, the investigation of the application of laws relating to society, public welfare, and social security.

In 1932, it was once again renamed, becoming the Ministry of Public Health, then the Ministry of Public Health, Social Assistance and Welfare in 1936, and later the Ministry of Public Health and Social Welfare in 1953.

In 1959, the ministry was divided into the Ministry of Public Health, the modern form of the ministry, and, assuming the functions regulating the welfare of Chileans, the Ministry of Work and Social Welfare.

Finally, from 1973 to 1979, the internal structure of the ministry, now simply the Ministry of Health, was reorganized, creating services such as the National Health Fund, or FONASA.

Organization
Currently under the Ministry are the following public institutions:
 Fondo Nacional de Salud (FONASA)
 Public Health Institute of Chile (ISP)
 Center for Supply (CENABAST)
 The Health Services in each region of the country are charges with the coordination, management, and development of the assistance networks and execution of the ministry's action.

Titulars

Ministers of Hygiene, Social Assistance and Welfare

Ministers of Social Welfare

Ministers of Public Health (First Creation)

Ministers of Public Health, Social Assistance and Welfare

Ministers of Public Health and Social Welfare

Ministers of Public Health (Second Creation)

Additional information

See also

References

Sources

External links
 MINSAL official website 
 Official history
 Public Health policies and Ministers 
 Some biographies of famous Chilean doctors 
 Biographies of famous Chilean doctors and Freemasons 

Health
Medical and health organisations based in Chile
Chile
1959 establishments in Chile